Sadanand  is an Indian name. It may refer to

Sadanand Bakre, Indian painter and sculptor
Sadanand Chavan, Indian politician
Sadanand Date, Indian Police Service officer
Sadanand Deshmukh, Marathi language author
Sadanand Dhume, American writer and journalist
Sadanand Gowda, Indian politician
Sadanand Joshi, Indian entrepreneur 
Sadanand Maharaj, Fijian politician
Sadanand Maiya, Indian entrepreneur 
Sadanand Singh, Indian politician
Sadanand Tanavade, Indian politician
Sadanand Viswanath, Indian cricketer
Swaminathan Sadanand, Indian journalist
Daniel Sadanand, New Testament Scholar 
Kabir Sadanand, Indian actor and film director

Indian masculine given names